Pterolophia melanura is a species of beetle in the family Cerambycidae. It was described by Francis Polkinghorne Pascoe in 1857. It has a wide distribution in Asia.

Subspecies
 Pterolophia melanura melanura (Pascoe, 1857)
 Pterolophia melanura baweanensis Gilmour & Breuning, 1963

References

melanura
Beetles described in 1857